John Henry Kapp Farm is a historic farm complex and national historic district located near Bethania, Forsyth County, North Carolina.  The district encompasses seven contributing buildings, one contributing site, and four contributing structures dated between about 1870 and 1942.  They include a two-story, frame, vernacular I-house (1870, c. 1880, c. 1910); smokehouse; storage shed (late 1920s); shop (c. 1930); chicken house (1920s); corn crib / granary; barn (1870s); fence (c. 1900); corn crib / granary (c. 1900); tenant house (c. 1900); tobacco pack house (c. 1900); and the agricultural landscape.

It was listed on the National Register of Historic Places in 1992.

References

Farms on the National Register of Historic Places in North Carolina
Historic districts on the National Register of Historic Places in North Carolina
Houses in Forsyth County, North Carolina
National Register of Historic Places in Forsyth County, North Carolina